Henry Robinson (8 May 1897 – 1944), sometimes known as Henri Robinson, was a Belgian Communist and later intelligence agent of the Communist International (Comintern). Robinson was a leading member of the Red Orchestra in Paris. Robinson used a number of soubriquets (Andre, Lucien, Leo, Giocomo) and aliases (Otto Wehrli, Albert Gottlieb Bucher, Alfred Merian, Harry Leon, Alfree Duyen, Harry Merian)

Life

Born in Brussels, Robinson grew up in Belgium and was the child of David Robinson (born in Vilna Governorate) and Anna Cerhannovsky (born in Warsaw). 

During World War I, he studied in Geneva. After the war, Robinson was associated with German communist Willi Münzenberg and Swiss communist Jules Humbert-Droz in the Young Communist International, 

In 1923, Robinson was in charge of the AM-Apparat for military and political work in the Rhineland and was Political Director of the Young Communist League of Germany's Ruhr district and attended conferences in Berlin, where he met his partner Klara Schabbel He took part in the fighting against the occupation of the Rhine and Ruhr area by French troops. Robinson became a member of the Communist Party of Germany (KPD) and made several visits to the Soviet Union with Schabbel. In 1924, Robinson was director of the AM-Apparat for Central and Eastern Europe.  In 1924, Robinson published a leaflet,  under a pseudonym,Harry, along with Grigoriy Zinoviev, director of Comintern,  titled: L'I.C.J. en luttle contre l'occupation de la Ruhr et la guerre ( The I.C.J. fights against the occupation of the Ruhr and the war). Between 1928–1930, Robinson assisted General Muraille, Chief of Soviet espionage in France. 

From about 1930, both worked for the intelligence service of the Comintern, which later merged with the Red Army's GRU intelligence service, and the Young Communist International. Robinson became the section leader for Switzerland, France, and Great Britain.  Schabbel maintained links to Berlin and, through the Soviet commercial agency there, provided communications to Moscow until June 1941.

In 1936, Robinson moved to Paris, where he worked with the Soviet Military attaché at the Soviet embassy. While he was there, he was in contact with Maria Josefovna Poliakova and Rachel Dübendorfer in Geneva, Switzerland where he liaised between groups in France, Switzerland and the Great Britain. 

During the period he was in Paris, another agent, who was not identified was running his own espionage network in France and the United Kingdom.  British intelligence gave the unknown agent the moniker HARRY II. HARRY II was responsible for an agent in Great Britain, known as Ernst David Weiss who had been recruited in 1932. In May 1936, HARRY II introduced Weiss to two other Soviet agents who worked at the Royal Aircraft Establishment in Farnborough, Hampshire. In the same period, HARRY II introduced Weiss to Germaine Schneider a courier for the Soviet espionage network run by Leopold Trepper in France, Belgium and the Low Countries. In 1937, the unknown agent Harry II handed his espionage network in the Great Britain over to Robinson. Robinson arranged with Weiss to meet him in Jersey.  During 1938 Robinson visited the Great Britain several times to meet other agents. He also visited Belgium and Switzerland for the same purpose during 1938. 

From 1940, Robinson had been promoted to head of the AM Apparat for Western Europe. Robinson ran an espionage network, known as group Harry, whose remit was to collect intelligence from French military and political groups, from within the Deuxième Bureau and within Vichy intelligence, from the Central Committee of the French Communist Party, from Gaullist groups and from UK groups.

Trepper network
In September 1941, Robinson met with Soviet Red Army Intelligence agent, Leopold Trepper, who at the time was technical director of Soviet Red Army Intelligence in western Europe. Trepper had been ordered to take over command of Robinson's espionage network. 

There was an intense dislike between the two men due to Robinson being forced to hand over his network to Trepper when he arrived in France, even though Robinson was senior to Trepper. The Comintern organisation had lost prestige with Stalin who suspected it of deviating from Communist norms and Robinson was suspected of being an agent of the Deuxième Bureau and who was subsequently in ideological conflict with the aims of Soviet intelligence. This changeover had been facilitated in a meeting organised by General Ivan Susloparov. The group provided Trepper with intelligence on General Henri Giraud, the Dieppe Raid, coverage of Allied bombings in France and planning for Operation Torch.

Arrest
In December 1942 Robinson was arrested in Paris by the Sonderkommando Rote Kapelle. According to British records, the RSHA had become aware of Robinson from information obtained from Leopold Trepper, whom they had previously arrested. According to Horst Kopkow of Reich Security Main Office AMT IV A2, Robinson was held in custody in France, where he was repeatedly tortured, before being brought to the Moabit detention centre in Germany to stand trial by General Judge of the Luftwaffe Manfred Roeder at the same time as Harro Schulze-Boysen.

At the time of his arrest, four false passports were found in the possession of Robinson, as well as the famous Robinson Papers.

Robinson papers
The Robinson papers were over 800 papers contained in briefcases, that were found underneath the floorboards of a hotel room that Robinson had regularly used. The originals had been lost but photostats had survived and these were sent by Abwehr IIF in France to Abwehrstelle Belgium, where they were captured during the British advance. In 1966, British intelligence comment:

the Robinson papers, apart from [Ernest David] Weiss, did not give any positive lead to spies in the UK. They do, indicate that Robinson played an important part in running Russian operations in the UK in the 1930s and it seems... 

Many of the code names in the documents have never been identified.

References

Further reading 
 Gilles Perrault, Auf den Spuren der Roten Kapelle (In the footsteps of the Red Orchestra). Vienna: Europaverlag, 1994, .

Red Orchestra (espionage)
Communist members of the French Resistance
GRU officers
World War II spies for the Soviet Union
1897 births
1944 deaths
Executed spies
Resistance members killed by Nazi Germany